Otxarkoaga-Txurdinaga is the third district of the city of Bilbao (Biscay), in the Spanish Basque Country. It is divided into the neighbourhoods of Otxarkoaga and Txurdinaga. It has an area of 389.94 hectares and a population of 26,458 inhabitants (2016), being one of the least densely populated districts of the city.

History 
These two neighbourhoods were historically part of the old parish of Begoña. In these areas existed vineyards for the elaboration of the traditional Txakoli white wine, this has given the inhabitants the nickname of Matxorris, from Basque language Mahats=grape and orri=plant.

The Basque Football Federation has its offices in the area, on Julian Gaiarre Etorbidea.

Transport 
The Bilbobus and BizkaiBus bus lines have stops in the district. In 2017, line 3 of the Bilbao metro opened, with the Otxarkoaga and Txurdinaga stations in the district.

Sights

References

Districts of Bilbao